In organic chemistry, the triflyl group (systematic name: trifluoromethanesulfonyl group) is a functional group with the formula  and structure . The triflyl group is often represented by –Tf.

The related triflate group (trifluoromethanesulfonate) has the formula , and is represented by –OTf.

See also
 Triflyl azide, TfN3
 Trioctylmethylammonium bis(trifluoromethylsulfonyl)imide, 
 Comins' reagent
 Bis(trifluoromethanesulfonyl)aniline
 Triflic anhydride (CF3SO2)2O is a very strong triflating agent.

References

Triflyl compounds
Functional groups